Elizabeth Parkinson is an American stage actress and dancer. She is best known for playing Brenda in the original production of the musical Movin' Out. For this performance she was nominated for the 2003 Tony Award for Best Performance by a Leading Actress in a Musical, the Drama Desk Award for Outstanding Actress in a Musical and won the 2003 Astaire Award for Best Female Dancer.

Career
Parkinson has performed with many ballet companies, including Joffrey Ballet and Twyla Tharp Dance. She appeared on Broadway in the musical Fosse in 1999 and then in Movin' Out (2002).

Parkinson appeared in the Stephen Sondheim and Wynton Marsalis Encores! concert, A Bed and a Chair: A New York Love Affair, from November 13 through 17, 2013 at City Center, New York City.

She is the co-owner/co-director of Fineline Theatre Arts with her husband, fellow performer Scott Wise; the couple have one child.

References

External links

Living people
American female dancers
Dancers from Connecticut
American musical theatre actresses
People from Sherman, Connecticut
Place of birth missing (living people)
Year of birth missing (living people)
21st-century American women